Pseudoetrema is a genus of sea snails, marine gastropod mollusks in the family Clathurellidae.

Species
Species within the genus Pseudoetrema include:
 Pseudoetrema crassicingulata (Schepman, 1913)
 Pseudoetrema fortilirata (E. A. Smith, 1879)

References

External links
  Bouchet, P.; Kantor, Y. I.; Sysoev, A.; Puillandre, N. (2011). A new operational classification of the Conoidea (Gastropoda). Journal of Molluscan Studies. 77(3): 273-308

 
Gastropod genera